1. deild kvenna, also known as Inkasso deild kvenna (English: The Inkasso League) for sponsorship reasons, is the second tier women's football league in Iceland. The league was founded in 1982 and current champions are Fylkir. It features 10 teams and the top two qualify for a spot in the Úrvalsdeild kvenna.

Champions 
The list of all champions

 1982: Víðir
 1983: Þór
 1984: ÍBK
 1985: Haukar
 1986: Stjarnan
 1987: Fram
 1988: Breiðablik
 1989: BÍ
 1990: Þróttur Neskaupstað
 1991: Stjarnan
 1992: KA
 1993: Höttur
 1994: ÍBA
 1995: Afturelding
 1996: Haukar
 1997: Reynir Sandgerði
 1998: Grindavík
 1999: Þór/KA
 2000: Grindavík
 2001: Þróttur Reykjavík
 2002: Þróttur Reykjavík
 2003: Fjölnir
 2004: Keflavík
 2005: Fylkir
 2006: Fjölnir
 2007: HK/Víkingur
 2008: ÍR
 2009: Haukar
 2010: ÍBV
 2011: FH
 2012: Þróttur Reykjavík
 2013: Fylkir
 2014: KR
 2015: ÍA
 2016: Haukar
 2017: HK/Víkingur
 2018: Fylkir

By club

See also 
 1. deild karla (men's football league)

References

External links 
 Standings on Official Site
 int.soccerway.com
 IcelandFootball.net - List of Ladies Second Level Champions 

women
Summer association football leagues
Women's football in Iceland
Women's sports leagues in Iceland
Professional sports leagues in Iceland